Elizabeth Willoughby, 3rd Baroness Willoughby de Broke, de jure 11th Baroness Latimer (c.1512 – c. 15 November 1562) was an English noblewoman and wife of Sir Fulke Greville.

Life
Elizabeth Willoughby was the eldest daughter of Edward Willoughby of Alcester, Warwickshire, and Powick, and Margaret Neville, daughter of Anne Stafford and Richard Neville, 2nd Baron Latimer. Elizabeth's father, Edward Willoughby, died in November 1517, leaving Elizabeth still a minor. Her wardship was acquired in 1522 by Sir Edward Greville of Milcote, Warwickshire. At her grandfather's death on 11 November 1521, the baronies of Willoughby de Broke and Latimer fell into abeyance between his three granddaughters; all daughters of his son Edward; Elizabeth, Anne and Blanche. The barony was settled on Elizabeth after Anne and Blanche died childless.

Shortly before 11 April 1526 Sir Edward Greville married his ward Elizabeth to his second son, Sir Fulke Greville (bef. 1505–10 November 1559) of Beauchamps Court, Alcester. He did so because Elizabeth preferred Fulk over his older brother John. A manuscript dated 1644 entitled The Genealogie, Life and Death of Robert, Lord Brooke, then in the possession of the Earl of Warwick, describes their courtship:

In 1542/3 Elizabeth's husband, Fulke Greville, was knighted by Henry VIII for military service to the crown. He was High Sheriff of Warwickshire in 1543 and a member of Parliament from 1547. He further distinguished himself along with forty men in the suppression of the Pilgrimage of Grace and served in campaigns in 1544 against France. He built his wife and family a new house at Beauchamp's Court with stone reclaimed from Alcester Priory. Fulk died on 10 Nov 1559. Elizabeth died 9 November 1562 and was buried beside her husband with a monumental inscription.

At her death, the title passed to her eldest son, Fulke Greville, 4th Baron Willoughby de Broke.

Family
Elizabeth Willoughby and Sir Fulke Greville had seven sons and eight daughters among whom were:

Fulke Greville, 4th Baron Willoughby de Broke.
Robert Greville
Sir Edward Greville, who married Jane Grey. 
Mary Greville, who married William Harris.
Eleanor Greville, who married Sir John Conway.
Katherine Greville (d.1611), who married Giles Reade (d.1611), esquire, of Tewkesbury, Gloucestershire, by whom she had thirteen children.
Blanche Greville.
Five additional sons
Four other daughters

Ancestry

Notes

References

External links
The Family Forest Descendants of Lady Joan Beaufort by Bruce Harrison

1510s births
1562 deaths
Elizabeth
16th-century English nobility
16th-century English women
English baronesses
People from Alcester
Elizabeth
Year of birth uncertain
3